St Andrew's Church, in Chippenham, Wiltshire, England, is a Church of England parish church. It is one of four Anglican parish churches in the town, and serves the south and east of Chippenham.  The church is situated in the Market Place, beside the town centre, and is Grade II* listed.

St Andrew's is a large church, with a wide nave, separated from a long chancel by a wooden, early 20th century screen. There is a Lady Chapel to the southeast of the chancel which is the oldest part of the church. There are two nave aisles, both of substantial width. A side chapel adjoining the south aisle is used as a Baptistry - it is also known as St Katherine's Chapel. There is a notable monument near the west end of the south aisle, to the Prynne family.

History
The church has 12th-century origins but was largely rebuilt in the 15th century, including the addition of the ornate south chapel which was built in 1442 for Walter, Lord Hungerford. The tower has a base from the 14th century but the rest was rebuilt in 1633. The church was restored in 1875–78, when the roof was raised, the chancel extended and the interior rearranged. A vestry was added in 1907.

The tower's eight bells were cast in 1734.

Traces remain of a west gallery, which, prior to the reordering in the 1870s, contained the Seede organ.  The gallery was taken down when the organ was enlarged and moved to the east end of the north aisle.  There was also a gallery in St Katherine's Chapel, also no longer in existence, though supporting stones for it can still be seen in the interior walls.

Services
St Andrew's currently has two services of Holy Communion on Sundays during lockdown, at 9am and 10.30am. Both are Covid secure, but at 9am we bring our own bread and the wine is not shared. At 10.30, the wine is offered in individual glasses, and singing is led by a smal group.

It is currently closed for worship.

Choirs
There are two singing groups involved in church services, the Robed Choir and the St Andrew's Singers. The former sings at the main morning service on the 2nd, 4th, and 5th Sundays. Choral services have been maintained at this church for many years. The latter singing group, less formally constituted, provides the music for the All Age services on the 1st Sunday morning of the month.

The church is affiliated to the Royal School of Church Music, and training in the robed choir follows the RSCM's Voice for Life programme.

Organ
The organ is a large three-manual and pedal instrument with 46 speaking stops. It retains much pipework from the organ by Brice Seede of 1752, together with the fine case façade. Pedal pipes and mechanical stop-changing facilities were added by Holdich in 1852. In 1879 the instrument was rebuilt by Gray and Davison when it was moved from its original west gallery location to a north aisle organ chamber.  Further additions were made in the 20th century: the organ was converted to pneumatic action by Adkins in 1931, a detached console with electro-pneumatic controls was installed in a further rebuild by Percy Daniel & Co. in 1965, and further alterations were made by Coulson in 1986.

Cultural events
The church is also used non-liturgically by a number of local groups (orchestras and choirs) as their performance venue.

Recitals and concerts are organized from time to time. Local schools (primary and secondary) use the church for their Christmas events, generally during the full week prior to Christmas.  Some also use the church for concerts at other times.

References

Sources

External links
 
 

1085 establishments in England
Christian monasteries established in the 11th century
Chippenham
Chippenham
Chippenham